Thistleton may refer to:

Places
Thistleton in Rutland, England
Thistleton in the parish of Greenhalgh-with-Thistleton, in Fylde, Lancashire, England
Thistleton, Kingston upon Hull, a former place

People
Katie Thistleton (born 1989), Children's BBC television presenter

See also
Thiselton-Dyer, an English surname